Sarah Wright (born 6 May 1994) is an Australian rules footballer playing for the North Melbourne Football Club in the AFL Women's (AFLW). Wright was drafted by North Melbourne with their second selection and thirty-second overall in the 2019 AFL Women's draft. She made her debut against  at Casey Fields in the opening round of the 2020 season.

References

External links 

1994 births
Living people
North Melbourne Football Club (AFLW) players
Australian rules footballers from Victoria (Australia)